The 2013–14 season was Dinamo Zagreb's 23rd season in the Croatian First Division and 102nd year in existence as a football club.

Season review

Pre-season and friendlies

Domestic competitions

Croatian Supercup
On 6 July 2013, champions Dinamo Zagreb will face Cup holders Hajduk Split at Maksimir, for the 2013 Supercup title. Dinamo Zagreb won after penalties 4-1. After 90 minutes the result was 1-1. Duje Čop scored only goal for Dinamo Zagreb.

Croatian First Division
On 12 July 2013, Dinamo Zagreb played first game of the new season against Osijek and won 3-1. Duje Čop scored two goals and Hillel Soudani scored once.

Croatian Cup

First team squad

Transfers and loans

In

Summer

Loan in

Out

Summer

Loan out

Overall transfer activity

Spending
Summer:  €700,000

Winter:  €0

Total:  €700,000

Income
Summer:  €5,000,000

Winter:  €0

Total:  €5,000,000

Expenditure
Summer:  €0

Winter:  €0

Total:  €0

MAXtv Prva Liga 

Kickoff times are in CET

League table

Results summary

Results by round

Results and fixtures

Legend

Matches

UEFA Champions League
The team won the Croatian championship last season and as such will enter the 2013–14 UEFA Champions League second qualifying round. On 16 July 2013, Dinamo Zagreb played first qualification game against Fola Esch in Luxembourg. They won 0-5, Two time scorer was Hilel Soudani, Duje Čop, Arijan Ademi and Junior Fernandes scored once. They won 1–0 in the replay and progressed to the third qualifying round.

Third qualifying round

Play-off round

UEFA Europa League

Group B

Notes

References

2013–14
APOEL F.C. season
2013-14